Oberea kostini is a species of beetle in the family Cerambycidae. It was described by Mikhail Leontievich Danilevsky in 1988. It is known from Russia.

References

Beetles described in 1988
kostini